Mahmoud Mar'ashi Najafi or Seyyed Mahmoud Mar'ashi Najafi (born 1941) is an Iranian librarian, Bibliographer and manuscript expert. He is the director of Mar'ashi Najafi Library, which he says is one of the largest libraries in Iran and the world.

Life and education
Seyyed Mahmoud Mar'ashi Najafi, the eldest son of Shahab ud-Din Mar'ashi Najafi and the grandson of Seyyed Shamsuddin Mahmoud Mar'ashi Najafi, was born in 1941 in Qom, Iran. After elementary and high school in Qom, he started learning Islamic seminary sciences, studied the basics and first levels with prominent professors such as Fazel Lankarani, Seyyed Mahdi Lajevardi, Abutaleb Tajlil Tabrizi, Mohammad Sadegh Nasiri Sarabi, Mohammad Taghi Sotoudeh and Seyyed Ahmad Varamini. He then learned the highest level of seminary lessons from his father, who was a distinguished professor, and until the last days of his father's life, he was his disciple. In addition to studying religious sciences, Mar'ashi studied books and treatises of the ancients and the late in these fields due to his great interest in the sciences of rijal, genealogy, bibliography and codicology. In this way, he used his father's instructions and experiences a lot and gradually became an expert. He has received many permissions from many professors and elders. He then entered the academic sciences in the field of sociology. Mar'ashi continued his studies in sociology, first at the University of Tehran and then at the University of London, and in 1985 received a doctorate in sociology from the University of London.

Bibliography

Books
Seyyed Mahmoud Mar'ashi Najafi 's independent works are mainly in the field of cataloging of manuscripts, bibliography and biography of a number of Iranian Muslim thinkers. From 1962 to 2003, in a period of forty-one years, he has authored twelve books. In addition, he has corrected 9 works and 64 books have been published under his supervision. Among his independent works, the following can be mentioned (all in Persian language):

 Sharhe Haal va Afkar va Asaar va Aqayed va Nazariate Ibn Sina (Biography, thoughts, works, ideas and theories of Avicenna), 1962
 Sharhe Haal va Asaar va Araae va Aqayed va Nazariate Abu Hamed Ghazali (Biography, works, opinions, ideas and theories of Al-Ghazali), 1962
 Sharhe Haal va Asaar va Araae Abu Nasr Farabi (Biography, works and opinions of Al-Farabi)
 Al-Mosalsalaat fi al-Ejaazaat (The series of permissions), Arabic, 1995
 Ganjineh: Fehreste Bakhshi az Noskhehaye Khattie Farsie Samarkand va Bukhara va Khwarazm (Thesaurus (List of part of Persian manuscripts of Samarkand, Bukhara and Khwarazm)), 1998
 Fehreste Noskhehaye Khatti Ketabkhaneye Bozorge Ayatollah al-Ozma Mar'ashi Najafi (List of manuscripts of the Grand Library of Grand Ayatollah Marashi Najafi), 2000-2001
 Fehreste Noskhehaye Khatti Asaare Allame Seyyed Roknuddin Haidar Hosseini Amoli dar Ketabkhaneye Hazrate Ayatollah al-Ozma Mar'ashi Najafi (List of manuscripts of the works of Allama Seyyed Roknuddin Haidar Hosseini Amoli in the library of Grand Ayatollah Mar'ashi Najafi), 2002
 Fehreste Noskhehaye Khatti Asaare Allame Qazi Noorollah Mar'ashi Shustari dar Ketabkhaneye Hazrate Ayatollah al-Ozma Mar'ashi Najafi (List of manuscripts of the works of Qazi Nurullah Shustari in the library of Grand Ayatollah Mar'ashi Najafi), 2002
 Fehreste Noskhehaye Khatti Asaare Allame Nezamuddin Abdul Ali Birjandi (List of manuscripts of the works of Al-Birjandi), 2002
 Noskhehaye Khatti Kohan va Nafise Nahj al-Balagha va Shoroohe Bargozideh va Tarjomehaye Aan dar Ketabkhaneye Ayatollah al-Ozma Mar'ashi Najafi (Ancient and exquisite manuscripts of Nahj al-Balagha and selected commentaries and translations of it in the library of Grand Ayatollah Marashi Najafi), 2002
 Navader al-Makhtootaat al-Arabiah men Qarn al-Saaless ela al-Saadess al-Hijri (Rare Arabic manuscripts from the third century to the seventh century AH), Arabic, 2002
 Ketab Shenasi Tosifie Hazrate Ayatollah al-Ozma Mar'ashi Najafi (Descriptive bibliography of Grand Ayatollah Mar'ashi Najafi), 2003
 Safarnameye Chin (Travelogue of China)
 Oday ibn al-Raqqa, Shaere Qarne Avval (Oday ibn al-Raqqa, poet of the first century AH)
 Fehreste Bakhshi az Noskhehaye Khatti Mansoub beh Alemane Samarkand (List of part of the manuscripts attributed to the scholars of Samarkand)
 Moroori bar Zendegie Seyyed Abdul Hadi Delijani (An overview of the life of Seyyed Abdul Hadi Delijani)
 Nokhostin Ketabhaye Chappi Arabi va Farsi keh dar Jahan Montasher Shodeh (The first Arabic and Persian printed books published in the world)
 Noskhehaye Khatti Kohan Nahj al-Balagha (Ancient manuscripts of Nahj al-Balagha)
 Jahane Ketabkhaneha: Gozideh Maqaalaat Darbareye Ketabkhanehaye Iran va Jahan (World of the Libraries: A selection of articles about Iranian and world libraries), 2012
 Mirase Mandegar (Lasting heritage), 2003
 Marja e Miras Baan (Inheritance keeper Marja'), 2011
 Fehreste Dast Neveshtehaye Asaare Khajeh Nasiruddin Mohammad ibn Mohammad Tusi dar Ketabkhaneye Bozorge Hazrate Ayatollah al-Ozma Mar'ashi Najafi (List of Manuscripts of the Works of Nasir al-Din al-Tusi in the Great Library of Grand Ayatollah Mar'ashi Najafi), 2005
 Ketab Shenasie Asaare Dat Nevise Allame Kamaluddin Meysam ibn Ali Bahrani (Bibliography of the manuscripts of Allamah Maitham Al Bahrani), 2006
 Shenakht Nameye Seyed Abdolhadi Hosseini Delijani (Cognition treatise about Seyed Abdolhadi Hosseini Delijani), 2007
 Ejaazaat va Namehaye Ayatollah al-Ozma Seyyed Abu Al-Hassan Isfahani to Ayatollah al-Ozma Seyyed Shahabuddin Mar'ashi Najafi (Permits and letters of Grand Ayatollah Seyyed Abu Al-Hassan Isfahani to Grand Ayatollah Seyyed Shahabuddin Mar'ashi Najafi), Arabic, 2008
 Marja' e Farhang Baan (Culture keeper Marja'), 2009
 Mowsoo'ah al-Imamah fi Nosoos Ahle al-Sonnah (The encyclopedia of the Imam in the texts of the Sunnis), 2009
 Makatib al-Mahfooz (Reserved letters), 2009
 Noskheh Shenasi (Codicology: Studies on manuscripts of Iran and of the world), 2007
 Namehaye Namvaran (Letters of the prominents), 2010
 Shasto Seh Noskheh Khatti Nafis az Sadehaye Cheharom va Panjom va Sheshom Hejri (Sixty-three exquisite manuscripts from the fourth, fifth and sixth centuries AH), 1994
 Yeksado Seh Noskheye Khatti az Sadeye Haftom Hejri (One hundred and three manuscripts from the seventh century AH), 1994
 Devisto Hashtad Noskheye Khatti Nafis az Qarne Hashtom (Two hundred and eighty exquisite manuscripts from the eighth century AH), 1994
 Ketab Khaneye Omoomi Hazrate Ayatollah al-Ozma Mar'ashi Najafi dar Yek Negah (Grand Ayatollah Mar'ashi Najafi Public Library at a glance), 1992
 Ganjineh Shahab: Majmooeh Resaleha va Maqalehaye Elmi dar Pasdaasht Hazrate Ayatollah al-Ozma Mar'ashi Najafi (Treasures of Shahab: A Collection of Scientific Treatises and Articles in Honor of Grand Ayatollah Mar'ashi Najafi), 2001
 Ranj va Ganj (Suffering and treasure), 2007
 Fehrestvareye Noskhehaye Khatti Asaare Elmie Fayz Kashani dar Ganjineh Jahani Makhtootaat Eslami Ketabkhaneye Bozorge Hazrate Ayatollah al-Ozma Mar'ashi Najafi (Catalog of Manuscripts of Fayz Kashani's Scientific Works in the World Treasure of Islamic Manuscripts of the Mar'ashi Najafi Library), 2008
 Noskhehaye Noyafteh (Newly found manuscripts: A report on a selection of manuscripts purchased by the Mar'ashi Najafi Library (World Treasure of Islamic Manuscripts)), 2008
 Faqihe Farzaneh: Zendegi Nameye Ayatollah Seyyed Morteza Faqih Mobarqa (The Wise Faqih: Biography of Ayatollah Seyyed Morteza Faqih Mobarqa), 2009
 Tariq Sheikh Ansari ela al-Ma'soom (The path of Murtadha al-Ansari to the Infallible), Arabic, 1995
 Ganjineh: Fehreste Bakhshi az Noskhehaye Khattie Farsi va Arabie Samarkand va Bukhara va Khwarazm (Thesaurus: List of part of Persian and Arabic manuscripts of Samarkand, Bukhara and Khwarazm), 1998
 Fehreste Namgooye Nosakhe Khattie Makhzane Hamid Soleiman Anstitoo Shaq Shenasi Abu Reyhan Birooni (Ozbakestan) (List of manuscripts of Hamid Soleiman Repository of Abu Rihan Biruni, Institute of Oriental Studies (Uzbekistan)), 1998

Articles
Dr. Mar'ashi has published the results of his studies in the fields of librarianship, archiving and manuscript research, his experiences and his visits of the cultural centers of different countries in more than 60 articles, conversations and reports in the following publications:

 Mirase Shahab (The Shahab's Heritage), journal, since 1995
 Miras (The Heritage), journal
 Mirase Eslami (The Islamic Heritage), journal

Some of these articles have also been published in his book Ganjineh Shahab. Among other Mar'ashi 's articles, the following can be mentioned (all in Persian language):

 Noskhehaye Khattie Noyafteh (Newly found manuscripts), 2011
 Danesh Nameye Kootahe Farsi (Concise Persian encyclopedia), 2010
 Olamaye Shiiee va Masaleye Ejazeh dar Qarne Noozdahom (Shiite scholars and the issue of the permission in the nineteenth century AH), translator, 2010
 Kabikaj dar Noskhehaye Khatti (Ranunculus lanuginosus in the manuscripts), 2010
 Ketabcheye Porseh va Pasokh ya Estentaq az Mirza Reza Kermani (Question and Answer Booklet or Interrogation of Mirza Reza Kermani), 2009
 Joqrafiaye Khuzestan (Geography of Khuzestan), 2009
 Ketab Shenasie Kamaluddin Meysam Bahrani (Bibliography of Maitham Al Bahrani), 2006
 Resaleye Montakhab (The selected treatise), 2006
 Eslam, Iran, Chin (Islam, Iran, China), 2004
 Safarnameye Eshqabad, Samaqand va Bokhara (Travelogue of Ashgabat, Samarkand and Bukhara), 2004
 Gozareshe Safare Faranse (Travel report to France), 2004
 Maraseme Eftetahe Ketabkhaneh Eskandarieh (Opening Ceremony of the Bibliotheca Alexandrina Library), 2002
 Do Nemooneh az Qoranhaye Koofie Kohan; Az Ganjineye Noskhehaye Khattie Ketabkhaneye Bozorge Ayatollah al-Ozma Mar'ashi Najafi (Two versions of ancient Kufi Qurans; From the treasure trove of manuscripts of the Mar'ashi Najafi Library), 2001
 Noskhehaye Kharidari Shodeh (Purchased manuscripts), 2001
 Noskhehaye Khattie Ketabkhaneye Aref Hekmat (Manuscripts of Aref Hekmat Library), 2000
 Moallefe Rabi al-Shi'ah (The author of the Rabi 'al-Shi'ah), 2000
 Noskhehaye Jadide Ketabkhaneh (Gozide ee az Noskhehaye Khattie Kohan va Nafise Tazeh Kharidari Shodeh) (New manuscripts of the library (Excerpts from Old and Exquisite Manuscripts Newly Purchased)), 2000
 Konferanse Beinol Melalie Noskhehaye Khatti (The International Conference of the Manuscripts), 2000
 Do Ketabkhaneye Nafise Shakhsi (Two exquisite personal libraries), 2000
 Ketab va Ketabkhaneh; Atlalat ala Maktabata Ayatollah al-Ozma Mar'ashi (Books and libraries; Informations about the Mar'ashi Najafi Library), 1999
 Rahtoosheye Ozbakestan (Route luggage of Uzbekistan), 1998
 Ketabkhaneye Shakhsie Ayatollah Bahari Hamedani (Personal Library of Ayatollah Bahari Hamedani), 1998
 Jahan Ketabkhaneh; Ketabkhaneye Shakhsie Ayatollah Bahari Hamedani (World Library; Ayatollah Bahari Hamedani Personal Library), 1998
 Mirase Khattie Ketabkhaneh; Noskhehaye Khattie Zakhireye Khwarazm Shahi (Library manuscript heritage; Khwarazmian dynasty Saved Manuscripts), 1998
 Ravian va Shoyookhe Shiee Bokhari (Bukhari Shiite narrators and sheikhs), 1998
 Gozareshe Safar beh Ozbakestan (Travel report to Uzbekistan), 1997
 Noskhehaye Nehayah Sheikh Tusi (The manuscripts of the book Al-Nihayah by Shaykh Tusi), 1997
 Tafsire Balabel al-Qalaqel (Interpretation of the Balabel al-Qalaqel), 1994
 Gozideye Ketab Shansie Tosifie Foraqe Eslami (Excerpts from the descriptive bibliography of Islamic sects), 1990
 Sharhi Noyafteh bar Tahdhib al-Ahkam Sheikh al-Taefeh Mohammad ibn Hassan Tusi (A newly found commentary on the Tahdhib al-Ahkam of Shaykh Tusi), 2019
 Dast Neveshtehayi Andar Baabe Ketab Namehaye Valede Bozorgvaram Marhoom Ayatollah al-Ozma Mar'ashi Najafi va Farzande Arshade Ayatollah Sheikh Agha Bozorg Tehrani (Manuscripts on the book-letters of my great father, the late Grand Ayatollah Shahab ud-Din Mar'ashi Najafi, and the eldest son of Ayatollah Sheikh Agha Bozorg Tehrani), 2019
 Moqoofate Mandegar (4): Do Noskheye Nafis az Moqoofate Ayatollah al-Ozma Mar'ashi Najafi beh Ketabkhaneye Astane Moqaddase Hazrate Fatemeh Masoumeh (Lasting endowments (4): Two exquisite manuscripts of the endowments of Grand Ayatollah Mar'ashi Najafi to the library of the Fatima Masumeh Shrine), 2019
 Ketabkhaneh Melli Chin (National Library of China), 2010
 Iranian az Didgahe Ahle Beit -Alayhem al-Salam- (Iranians from the point of view of Ahl al-Bayt), corrector, 2009
 Kaqaz Sazi: Tarikh va San'at Pishe ee Kohan (Paper making: the history and industry of an ancient profession), introducer, 2009
 Dar Siasat Emam ra Moqaddam Midanestand (In politics, the Imam was considered a priority), interviewee, 2009
 Tarikhe Jazireh Qeshm (History of Qeshm Island), 2008
 Qanoon Tazkareh dar Doreye Qajar (Citizenship law in the Qajar period), 2008
 Shahab Fazl va Fazilat (Shahab of grace and virtue), 2008
 Elme Nasab Shenasi (Ba Yadi az Saraamade Tabaar Shenasane Moaser Ayatollah al-Ozma Mar'ashi Najafi) (Genealogy (in memory of the great contemporary genealogist Grand Ayatollah Mar'ashi Najafi)), 2006
 Rooznegare Esteqbal az Hojjaj; Talife Seyed Mohammad Hossein Razavi Hamedani (Journal of welcoming pilgrims; Compiled by Seyed Mohammad Hossein Razavi Hamedani), introducer, 2006
 Tajrobat al-Mosaferin; Talife Mirza Isa Khan Munshi (Experience of travelers; Written by Mirza Isa Khan Munshi), introducer, 2006
 Gozareshe Safare Arabestan (Saudi Arabia trip report), 2006
 Joqrafiaye Astan Quds Razavi; Mirza Ali Khan Sarhang (Nobar) (Geography of Astan Quds Razavi; Mirza Ali Khan Sarhang (Nobar)), introducer, 2006
 Noskhehaye Jadid; Gozideh ee az Noskhehaye Nafis va Kohane Kharidari Shodeh ya Ehdayi (New manuscripts; A selection of exquisite and ancient manuscripts purchased or donated), 2005
 Safarnameye Hend (Travelogue of India), 2005
 Pedaram (My father), 2004
 Safarnameye Abu Dhabi (Abu Dhabi Travelogue), 2004
 Ganjinehaye Khatti (Treasures of manuscript), interviewee, 2004
 Safarnameye Kuwait (Travelogue of Kuwait), 2004
 Gozideh ee az Ketabhaye latiny Kharidari Shodeh (Excerpts from purchased latinate books), 2004
 Gozareshe Safar beh Keshvare Maghreb (Travel report to Morocco), 2003
 Birjandi Nameh; Fehreste Noskhehaye Khattie Asaare Allameh Abdul Ali Birjandi dar Ketabkhanehaye Bozorge Hazrate Ayatollah al-Ozma Mar'ashi Najafi (Birjandi treatise; List of manuscripts of the works of Allamah Abdul Ali Birjandi in the Mar'ashi Najafi Library), 2003
 Ganjineh Ketabkhaneh; 450 Noskheye Nafis az Qarne Cheharom ta Hashtom (Library treasure; 450 exquisite manuscripts from the fourth to the eighth century AH), 2000
 Fehreste Asaare Khattie Khajeh Nasir al-Din Tusi dar Ketabkhaneh (List of manuscript works by Khajeh Nasir al-Din Tusi in the library), 1997
 Nezame Ketabdarie Eslami dar Sadehaye Sevvom ta Hashtom Hejri Qamari (Islamic library system in the third to eighth centuries AH), 1995
 Gozareshe Safar beh Showravi (Travel report of the Soviet Union), 1991
 Ashenayi ba Ketabkhaneye Ayatollah al-Ozma Mar'ashi Najafi (Get acquainted with the library of Grand Ayatollah Mar'ashi Najafi), 1990

Careers
 Director of Mar'ashi Najafi Library: Seyyed Mahmoud Mar'ashi Najafi, along with his father, played a major role in the establishment and development of the large Marashi Najafi Library in Qom. This library was established by Shahab ud-Din Mar'ashi Najafi and according to his will, its management is the responsibility of his descendants.
 Member of the World Library Organization
 Honorary member of Azerbaijan National Academy of Sciences
 Licensee and managing director of "Mirase Shahab" magazine, specialized quarterly of codicology and bibliography

Awards
 An honorary doctorate from the Azerbaijan National Academy of Sciences, 1990
 The prominent bibliographer of the country (Iran), 1995

See also
 Rasul Jafarian
 Seyyed Hassan Eslami Ardakani
 Mehdi Bayani
 Mohammad Taqi Danesh Pajouh
 Abdolmohammad Ayati
 Ahmad Vaezi
 Seyed Ali Asghar Dastgheib

References

External links
 An introduction to the collection of Islamic manuscripts in the library of Ayat Allah Marashi Najafī, Qom-Iran / Mahmoud Marashi
 Ayatollah Marashi Najafi Library
 Books by Ayatollah Mar'ashi Najafi unveiled
 Grand Ayatollah Mar’ashi Congress to be Held in Qom

1941 births
Living people
People from Qom
Qom Seminary alumni
Faculty of Social Sciences of the University of Tehran alumni
Alumni of the University of London
Iranian Shia scholars of Islam
Iranian librarians